Yelniki (Jeĺnik) is a village located in the Republic of Mordovia, Russia. It is the administrative center of Yelnikovsky District.

Geography 
Yelniki is located close to the river Malaya Varma, 32 km from the city of Krasnoslobodsk, 132 km from the city of Saransk and 84 km from the railroad junction.

History 

In the notes of F. Obreskov (1591–1592) it is written that Yelniki was founded at the end of the 16th century. The name of the village has its origin in the word  which means 'spruce forest'. A spruce forest was previously located close to the village. Currently there is no forest, just grasslands.

Population 

1959: 3253
1970: 3609
1979: 4020
1989: 5457
2002: 5678
2010: 5905

Transport 

This village is a road junction of local significance. The roads to Krasnoslobodsk, Temnikov and Pervomaisk are located here.

References 

Rural localities in Mordovia
Yelnikovsky District
Krasnoslobodsky Uyezd